Arising out of the 2000 Convention of NATUC, the main national trade union centre in Trinidad and Tobago, divisions took place which resulted in the formation of the Federation of Independent Trade Unions and Non-Governmental Organisations (FITUN). FITUN is not affiliated to any organisation.

Affiliated Unions
Those Unions affiliated to FITUN include:
 Communication Workers Union (Trinidad and Tobago)
 Oilfields Workers' Trade Union

See also
 List of trade unions
 List of federations of trade unions

References

National trade union centres of Trinidad and Tobago
2000 establishments in Trinidad and Tobago